Edilson Alberto Monteiro Sanches Borges (born 17 January 1995), known as Diney, is a Cape Verdean professional footballer who plays as a  as a centre-back for Moroccan club FAR Rabat.

Club career
Diney started his youth career with Vitória F.C. in 2010, before joining Marítimo B. On 30 November 2014, Diney made his professional debut with Marítimo B in a 2014–15 Segunda Liga match against Santa Clara. After good performances, Diney was promoted to Marítimo's first team squad, making his league debut against C.F. União.

On 13 June 2018, he joined Estoril.

International career
Diney made his debut for the Cape Verde national team in a 4–0 2018 FIFA World Cup qualification loss to Burkina Faso on 14 November 2017.

References

External links

Stats and profile at LPFP 

1995 births
Living people
People from Tarrafal
Cape Verdean footballers
Association football defenders
Cape Verde international footballers
2021 Africa Cup of Nations players
Primeira Liga players
Liga Portugal 2 players
Botola players
C.S. Marítimo players
G.D. Estoril Praia players
AS FAR (football) players
Cape Verdean expatriate footballers
Cape Verdean expatriate sportspeople in Portugal
Expatriate footballers in Portugal
Cape Verdean expatriate sportspeople in Morocco
Expatriate footballers in Morocco